Oakdale or Oak Dale may refer to:

Australia
Oakdale, New South Wales
Oakdale, Queensland, a locality in the South Burnett Region

Canada
Rural Municipality of Oakdale No. 320, Saskatchewan

United Kingdom
Oakdale, Caerphilly
Oakdale, Dorset

United States
 Oakdale, California
 Oakdale, Connecticut
 Oakdale, Illinois
 Oakdale, Indiana
 Oakdale, Iowa
 Oak Dale, Howard County, Iowa
 Oakdale, Louisiana
 Oakdale, Louisville, Kentucky
 Oakdale, a neighborhood in Dedham, Massachusetts
 Oakdale, Holyoke, Massachusetts
 Oakdale, West Boylston, Massachusetts
 Oakdale, Minnesota
 Oakdale, Missouri
 Oakdale, Nebraska
 Oakdale, New York
 Oakdale, Pennsylvania
 Oakdale, Tennessee
 Oakdale, Texas
 Oak Dale, Texas
 Oakdale, Wisconsin
 Oakdale (town), Wisconsin
 Oakdale Township (disambiguation), any of several townships within the United States
 The Toyota Oakdale Theatre, in Wallingford, Connecticut

Historical sites
 Oakdale Historic District, in Fort Wayne, Indiana
 Oakdale School (Madison, Indiana)
 Oakdale District, listed on the NRHP in Louisville, Kentucky
 Oakdale Manor, the former home of early 20th century Maryland Governor Edwin Warfield
 Oakdale Village Historic District, listed on the NRHP in West Boylston, Massachusetts
 Oakdale Cotton Mill Village, in Jamestown, North Carolina
 South Oakdale Historic District, in Medford, Oregon
 Oakdale (Pennsbury Township, Pennsylvania), a historic home
 Oakdale Public School, in Allegheny County, Pennsylvania
 Oakdale (Floyd, Virginia), a historic home and farm
 The Governor Joseph Johnson House (also known as Oakdale), in Bridgeport, West Virginia

Fictional U.S. places
 Oakdale, Illinois, the fictional setting for the soap opera As the World Turns
 Oakdale, Texas (Wishbone TV series)

See also
 Oakdale Cemetery (disambiguation)
 Oakdale School (disambiguation)